Zuleika Fuentes (born 29 June 1993) is a Puerto Rican handball player who plays for the club Rio Grande Handball. She is member of the Puerto Rican national team. She competed at the 2015 World Women's Handball Championship in Denmark.

Honors
 2017 Nor.Ca. Women's Handball Championship: All Star Team left wing
 2017 Caribbean Handball Cup: All Star Team left wing
 Handball at the 2018 Central American and Caribbean Games: Top scorer

References

1993 births
Living people
Puerto Rican female handball players
Place of birth missing (living people)
Handball players at the 2015 Pan American Games
Handball players at the 2019 Pan American Games
Pan American Games competitors for Puerto Rico
Central American and Caribbean Games silver medalists for Puerto Rico
Competitors at the 2018 Central American and Caribbean Games
Central American and Caribbean Games medalists in handball
21st-century Puerto Rican women